The Challenge is a 1938 British drama film directed by Milton Rosmer and Luis Trenker and starring Robert Douglas and Luis Trenker. The film is about the first successful ascent of the Matterhorn in 1865 by Edward Whymper.

This British film is one of two 1938 Trenker remakes of Struggle for the Matterhorn in which Trenker acted in 1928, the other being the German The Mountain Calls.

Cast
 Robert Douglas as Edward Whymper 
 Frank Birch as Rev. Charles Hudson 
 Geoffrey Wardwell as Lord Francis Douglas 
 Moran Caplat as Mr. Hadow 
 Lyonel Watts as F.K. Morris, Publisher 
 Luis Trenker as Jean Antoine Carrel 
 Mary Clare as Carrel's Mother 
 Fred Groves as Bruno Favre, Innkeeper 
 Joan Gardner as Felicitas Favre, Favre's Daughter 
 Laurence Baskcomb as The Podesta, Mayor
 Ralph Truman as Signor Giordano 
 Reginald Jarman as Minister Sella 
 Tony Sympson as Luc Meynet 
 Cyril Smith as Customs Officer 
 Lloyd Pearson as Alexander Seiler, Innkeeper 
 Violet Howard as Mrs. Seiler 
 Babita Soren as Mrs. Croz 
 Luis Gerold as Croz, Guide 
 Max Holzboer as Peter Taugwalder Sr., Guide 
 Emmerich Albert as A Ropemaker 
 Howard Douglas as A Ropemaker

See also
The Mountain Calls (1938)
First ascent of the Matterhorn

External links
 

1938 multilingual films
1938 drama films
1938 films
1930s adventure drama films
1930s historical drama films
British historical drama films
British adventure drama films
Films set in Switzerland
Films set in Italy
Films set in England
Films set in the Alps
Films set in 1865
Mountaineering films
Matterhorn
Films produced by Alexander Korda
British multilingual films
British remakes of German films
Sound film remakes of silent films
British black-and-white films
Films with screenplays by Patrick Kirwan
1930s British films